The Miklós Schweitzer Competition (Schweitzer Miklós Matematikai Emlékverseny in Hungarian) is an annual Hungarian mathematics competition for university undergraduates, established in 1949. 

It is named after Miklós Schweitzer (1 February 1923 – 28 January 1945), a young Hungarian mathematician who died under the Siege of Budapest in the Second World War.

The Schweitzer contest is uniquely high-level among mathematics competitions. The problems, written by prominent Hungarian mathematicians, are challenging and require in-depth knowledge of the fields represented. The competition is open-book and competitors are allowed ten days to come up with solutions.

The problems on the competition can be classified roughly in the following categories: 
1. Algebra 
2. Combinatorics 
3. Theory of Functions
4. Geometry
5. Measure Theory
6. Number Theory
7. Operators
8. Probability Theory
9. Sequences and Series
10. Topology 
11. Set Theory

Recently a similar competition has been started in France.

References

 Contests in higher mathematics (Hungary, 1949–1961). In memoriam, Miklós Schweitzer. (G. Szasz, L. Geher, I. Kovacs, L. Pinter, eds), Akadémiai Kiadó, Budapest, 1968 260 pp.
 Miklós Schweitzer Competition Problems in recent years
 Problems of the Miklós Schweitzer Memorial Competition at http://artofproblemsolving.com/

Mathematics competitions
Recurring events established in 1949
Student events